WFXE (104.9 FM) is a radio station broadcasting an urban contemporary format. Licensed to Columbus, Georgia, United States, the station serves the Columbus GA area.  The station is currently owned by Davis Broadcasting, Inc. of Columbus.  Its studios are co-located with four other sister stations on Wynnton Road in Columbus east of downtown, and its transmitter is located in Phenix City, Alabama.

History
The station was assigned the call letters WFXE-FM on December 1, 1978. Prior to that the station was known as WWRH or “RH105” as the jingles implied and had an adult contemporary type format. On March 7, 1980, the station changed its call sign to the current WFXE.

References

External links
Davis Broadcasting Inc.

FXE
Urban contemporary radio stations in the United States
Radio stations established in 1978